GetSimple CMS is a free web Content Management System with the primary goal to be simple and easy to use. It is based on the programming language PHP and uses XML files to store the content. It is a flat file Content Management System, in contrast to other CMS software, that tend to use databases such as MySQL.

History 

GetSimple CMS was created in 2009 by the resident in Pittsburgh, PA in the US web developer Chris Cagle, who still presides over the project as a senior developer. Cage claims he created GetSimple CMS out of the need of a CMS that is "as powerful as WordPress is to use", but easier. Since then, other developers have joined the GetSimple team. An active community contributes plug-ins, translations and themes.

Description 

GetSimple CMS was primarily developed for the creation of smaller websites, however it is also suitable for medium to large websites thanks to the extendability of the platform via plug-ins and themes. The target groups of the CMS are organizations, companies and individuals who need a small to medium-sized websites. According to statistics from W3Tech, GetSimple CMS is used by less than 0.1% of all sites on the internet.

A simple installation process (copying the files to the web server and start the installation routine) allows the immediate use of the software. Some web hosts offer the CMS already pre-installed. Once installed, the software can be expanded with numerous plug-ins and themes.

Reception 
GetSimple CMS has been downloaded over 120,000 times (as of March 2013). The magazine t3n assigns GetSimple as "micro" and "Minimal-CMS" one, praises the simplicity yet possible extensibility through plug-ins. The author of the article states that the theming concept of GetSimple belong to the most intuitive that he had ever seen. The British magazine Computer Active raises the backup function and the simplicity and cleanliness of the work surface as well as the supplied templates produced. The Content Manager magazine dedicated to the CMS a detailed presentation and took it in 2012 next to TYPO3 and WordPress in a comparison of 15 open source CMS on. Hot Scripts counted the CMS in May 2010 to the ten easiest and lightest weight scripts on the web, Design Shack counts it among 50 WordPress alternatives ranks eighth on. On the on Demo specialized installations Page OpenSourceCMS.com counted GetSimple to the 30 most common and best-rated systems (Stand 2013 ).

The German-speaking community has been dedicated as the only language other than English, a separate area on the official forum.

References

External links 
 GetSimple CMS – Official Website

Free content management systems
Blog software
Software forks
Free software programmed in PHP
PHP frameworks
Web frameworks
Content management systems
Cross-platform software
2005 software
Software using the GPL license
Internet software for Linux
MacOS Internet software
Windows Internet software